Frank Sinatra (1915–1998) was an American singer, actor, and producer who was one of the most popular and influential musical artists of the 20th century. Over the course of his acting career he created a body of work that one biographer described as being "as varied, impressive and rewarding as that of any other Hollywood star".

Sinatra began his career as a singer, initially in his native Hoboken, New Jersey, but increasing success led to a contract to perform on stage and radio across the United States. One of his earliest film roles was in the 1935 short film Major Bowes' Amateur Theatre of the Air, a spin off from the Major Bowes Amateur Hour radio show. He appeared in a full-length film in an uncredited cameo singing performance in Las Vegas Nights, singing "I'll Never Smile Again" with Tommy Dorsey's The Pied Pipers. His work with Dorsey's band also led to appearances in the full-length films Las Vegas Nights (1941) and Ship Ahoy (1942). As Sinatra's singing career grew, he appeared in larger roles in feature films, several of which were musicals, including three alongside Gene Kelly: Anchors Aweigh (1945), On the Town (1949) and Take Me Out to the Ball Game (1949). As his acting career developed further, Sinatra also produced several of the films in which he appeared, and directed one—None but the Brave—which he also produced and in which he starred.

Sinatra's film and singing careers had declined by 1952, when he was out-of-contract with both his record company and film studio. In 1953 he re-kindled his film career by targeting serious roles: he auditioned for—and won—a role in From Here to Eternity for which he won the Academy Award for Best Supporting Actor and the Golden Globe for Best Supporting Actor – Motion Picture. Other serious roles followed, including a portrayal of an ex-convict and drug addict in The Man with the Golden Arm, for which he was nominated for the Academy Award for Best Actor and the British Academy Film Award for the Best Actor in a Leading Role.

Sinatra received numerous awards for his film work. He won the Golden Globe for Best Actor – Motion Picture Musical or Comedy for Pal Joey (1957), and was nominated in the same category for Come Blow Your Horn (1963). Three of the films in which Sinatra appears, The House I Live In (1945), The Manchurian Candidate (1962) and From Here to Eternity (1953)—have been added to the Library of Congress's National Film Registry. The House I Live In—a film that opposes anti-Semitism and racism—was awarded a special Golden Globe and Academy Award. In 1970, at the 43rd Academy Awards, Sinatra was presented with the Jean Hersholt Humanitarian Award; the following year he was awarded the Golden Globe Cecil B. DeMille Award.

As actor

As producer

As director

Shorts

See also
List of awards and nominations received by Frank Sinatra

Notes and references

References

Sources

 
 
 
 
 
 
 

Frank Sinatra
Sinatra, Frank
Sinatra, Frank